The Cylinders of Nabonidus refers to cuneiform inscriptions of king Nabonidus of Babylonia (556-539 BC). These inscriptions were made on clay cylinders. They include the Nabonidus Cylinder from Sippar, and the Nabonidus Cylinders from Ur, four in number.

Description
The Nabonidus Cylinder from Sippar is a long text in which Nabonidus describes how he repaired three temples: the sanctuary of the moon god Sin in Harran, the sanctuary of the warrior goddess Anunitu in Sippar, and the temple of Šamaš in Sippar.

The Nabonidus Cylinders from Ur contain the foundation text of a ziggurat called E-lugal-galga-sisa, which belonged to the temple of Sin in Ur. Nabonidus describes how he repaired the structure. It is probably the king's last building inscription and may be dated to ca. 540 BC. The text is interesting because it offers a full syncretism of Sin, Marduk, and Nabu.

Nabonidus cylinders from Ur are also noteworthy because they mention a son named Belshazzar, who is mentioned in the Book of Daniel. The cylinders state:

"As for me, Nabonidus, king of Babylon, save me from sinning against your great godhead and grant me as a present a life long of days, and as for Belshazzar, the eldest son -my offspring- instill reverence for your great godhead in his heart and may he not commit any cultic mistake, may he be sated with a life of plenitude."

Excavation

In 1854, J.G. Taylor found four cuneiform cylinders in the foundation of a ziggurat at Ur. These were deposited by Nabonidus; all four apparently have an identical inscription.

In 1881, Assyriologist Hormuzd Rassam made an important find at Sippar in Babylonia (now called Abu Habba), where he discovered the temple of the sun. There he also found a clay cylinder of Nabonidus. This cylinder, excavated in the royal palace, is now in the Pergamon Museum in Berlin. A copy is in the British Museum in London. The text was written after Nabonidus' return from Arabia in his thirteenth regnal year, but before war broke out with the Persian king Cyrus the Great, who is mentioned as an instrument of the gods.

The Nabonidus Cylinder from Sippar contains echoes from earlier foundation texts, and develops the same themes as later ones, like the better-known Cyrus Cylinder: a lengthy titulary, a story about an angry god who has abandoned his shrine, who is reconciled with his people, orders a king to restore the temple, and a king who piously increases the daily offerings. Prayers are also included.

Translation of the Sippar cylinder
The translation of the Nabonidus Cylinder of Sippar was made by Paul-Alain Beaulieu, author of, "The Reign of Nabonidus, King of Babylon 556-539 B.C."

[i.1-7] I, Nabonidus, the great king, the strong king, the king of the universe, the king of Babylon, the king of the four corners, the caretaker of Esagila and Ezida, for whom Sin and Ningal in his mother's womb decreed a royal fate as his destiny, the son of Nabû-balâssi-iqbi, the wise prince, the worshiper of the great gods, I:

[i.8-ii.25] Ehulhul, the temple of Sin in Harran, where since days of yore Sin, the great lord, had established his favorite residence - his great heart became angry against that city and temple and he aroused the Mede, destroyed the temple and turned it into ruin - in my legitimate reign Bel and the great lord,[1] for the love of my kingship, became reconciled with that city and temple and showed compassion.

In the beginning of my everlasting reign they sent me a dream. Marduk, the great lord, and Sin, the luminary of heaven and the netherworld, stood together. Marduk spoke with me: 'Nabonidus, king of Babylon, carry bricks on your riding horse, rebuild Ehulhul and cause Sin, the great lord, to establish his residence in its midst.'

Reverently, I spoke to the Enlil of the gods, Marduk: 'That temple which you ordered me to build, the Mede surrounds it and his might is excessive.'

But Marduk spoke with me: 'The Mede whom you mentioned, he, his country and the kings who march at his side will be no more.'

At the beginning of the third year [Summer 553], they aroused him, Cyrus, the king of Anšan, his second in rank.[2] He scattered the vast Median hordes with his small army. He captured Astyages, the king of the Medes, and took him to his country as captive. Such was the word of the great lord Marduk and of Sin, the luminary of heaven and the netherworld, whose command is not revoked. I feared their august command, I became troubled, I was worried and my face showed signs of anxiety. I was not neglectful, nor remiss, nor careless.

For rebuilding Ehulhul, the temple of Sin, my lords, who marches at my side, which is in Harran, which Aššurbanipal, king of Assyria, son of Esarhaddon, a prince who proceeded me, had rebuilt, I mustered my numerous troops, from the country of Gaza on the border of Egypt, near the Upper Sea [the Mediterranean] on the other side of the Euphrates, to the Lower Sea [the Persian Gulf], the kings, princes, governors and my numerous troops which Sin, Šamaš and Ištar -my lords- had entrusted to me. And in a propitious month, on an auspicious day, which Šamaš and Adad revealed to me by means of divination, by the wisdom of Ea and Asalluhi, with the craft of the exorcist, according to the art of Kulla, the lord of foundations and brickwork, upon beads of silver and gold, choice gems, logs of resinous woods, aromatic herbs and cuts of cedar wood, in joy and gladness, on the foundation deposit of Aššurbanipal, king of Assyria, who had found the foundation of Šalmaneser [III], the son of Aššurnasirpal [II], I cleared its foundations and laid its brickwork.

I mixed its mortar with beer, wine, oil and honey and anointed its excavation ramps with it. More than the kings -my fathers- had done, I strengthened its building and perfected its work. That temple from its foundation to its parapet I built anew and I completed its work. Beams of lofty cedar trees, a product of Lebanon, I set above it. Doors of cedar wood, whose scent is pleasing, I affixed at its gates. With gold and silver glaze I coated its wall and made it shine like the sun. I set up in its chapel a 'wild bull' of shining silver alloy, fiercely attacking my foes. At the Gate of Sunrise I set up two 'long haired heroes' coated with silver, destroyers of enemies, one to the left, one to the right. I led Sin, Ningal, Nusku, and Sadarnunna -my lords- in procession from Babylon, my royal city, and in joy and gladness I caused them to dwell in its midst, a dwelling of enjoyment. I performed in their presence a pure sacrifice of glorification, presented my gifts, and filled Ehulhul with the finest products, and I made the city of Harran, in its totality, as brilliant as moonlight.

[ii.26-43a] O Sin, king of the gods of heaven and the netherworld, without whom no city or country can be founded, nor be restored, when you enter Ehulhul, the dwelling of your plenitude, may good recommendations for that city and that temple be set on your lips. May the gods who dwell in heaven and the netherworld constantly praise the temple of Sin, the father, their creator. As for me, Nabonidus king of Babylon, who completed that temple, may Sin, the king of the gods of heaven and the netherworld, joyfully cast his favorable look upon me and every month, in rising and setting, make my ominous signs favorable. May he lengthen my days, extend my years, make my reign firm, conquer my enemies, annihilate those hostile to me, destroy my foes. May Ningal, the mother of the great gods, speak favorably before Sin, her beloved, on my behalf. May Šamaš and Ištar, his shining offspring, recommend me favorably to Sin, the father, their creator. May Nusku, the august vizier, hear my prayer and intercede for me.

[ii.43b-46] The inscription written in the name of Aššurbanipal, king of Assyria, I found and did not alter. I anointed it with oil, performed a sacrifice, placed it with my own inscription, and returned it to its place.

[ii.47-iii.7] For Šamaš, the judge of heaven and the netherworld, concerning Ebabbar ['shining house'], his temple which is in Sippar, which Nebuchadnezzar, a former king had rebuilt and whose old foundation deposit he had looked for but not found -yet he rebuilt that temple and after forty-five years the walls of that temple had sagged- I became troubled, I became fearful, I was worried and my face showed signs of anxiety.

While I led Šamaš out of its midst and caused him to dwell in another sanctuary, I removed the debris of that temple, looked for its old foundation deposit, dug to a depth of eighteen cubits into the ground and then Šamaš, the great lord, revealed to me the original foundations of Ebabbar, the temple which is his favorite dwelling, by disclosing the foundation deposit of Naram-Sin, son of Sargon, which no king among my predecessors had found in three thousand and two hundred years.[3]

In the month Tašrîtu, in a propitious month, on an auspicious day, which Šamaš and Adad had revealed to me by means of divination, upon beds of silver and gold, choice gems, logs of resinous woods, aromatic herbs, and cuts of cedar wood, in joy and gladness, on the foundation deposit of Naram-Sin, son of Sargon, not a finger's breadth too wide or too narrow, I laid its brick work. Five thousand massive beams of cedar wood I set up for its roofing. Lofty doors of cedar wood, thresholds and pivots I affixed at its gates. Ebabbar, together with E-kun-ankuga ['pure stairway to heaven'], its ziggurat, I built anew and completed its work. I led Šamaš, my lord, in procession and, in joy and gladness, I caused him to dwell in the midst of his favorite dwelling.

[iii.8-10] The inscription in the name of Naram-Sin, son of Sargon, I found and did not alter. I anointed it with oil, made offerings, placed it with my own inscription and returned it to its original place.

[iii.11-21] O Šamaš, great lord of heaven and the netherworld, light of the gods -your fathers- offspring of Sin and Ningal, when you enter Ebabbar your beloved temple, when you take up residence in your eternal dais, look joyfully upon me, Nabonidus, king of Babylon, the prince your caretaker, the one who pleases you and built your august chapel, and upon my good deeds, and every day at sunrise and sunset, in the heavens and on the earth, make my omens favorable, accept my supplications and receive my prayers. With the scepter and the legitimate staff which placed in my hands may I rule forever.

[iii.22-38] For Anunitu -the lady of warfare, who carries the bow and the quiver, who fulfills the command of Enlil her father, who annihilates the enemy, who destroys the evil one, who precedes the gods, who, at sunrise and sunset, causes my ominous signs to be favorable- I excavated, surveyed and inspected the old foundations of Eulmaš, her temple which is in Sippar-Anunitu, which for eight hundred years,[4] since the time of Šagarakti-Šuriaš, king of Babylon, son of Kudur-Enlil, and on the foundation deposit of Šagarakti-Šuriaš, son of Kudur Enlil, I cleared its foundations and laid its brickwork. I built that temple anew and completed its work. Anunitu, the lady of warfare, who fulfills the command of Enlil her father, who annihilates the enemy, who destroys the evil one, who precedes the gods, I caused her to establish her residence. The regular offerings and the other offerings I increased over what they were and I established for her.

[iii.38-42] As for you, O Anunitu, great lady, when you joyfully enter that temple, look joyfully upon my good deeds and every month, at sunrise and sunset, petition Sin, your father, your begetter, for favors on my behalf.

[iii.43-51] Whoever you are whom Sin and Šamaš will call to kingship, and in whose reign that temple will fall into disrepair and who build it anew, may he find the inscription written in my name and not alter it. May he anoint it with oil, perform a sacrifice, place it with the inscription written in his own name and return it to its original place. May Šamaš and Anunitu hear his supplication, receive his utterance, march at his side, annihilate his enemy and daily speak good recommendations on his behalf to Sin, the father, their creator.

Verse account of Nabonidus
The following is a text known as the Verse account of Nabonidus (ME 38299). It was probably written during the reign of Cyrus the Great. William F. Albright called this the ″Panegyric of Cyrus″.

The translation was made by A. Leo Oppenheim and is copied from James B. Pritchard's Ancient Near Eastern Texts Relating to the Old Testament, 1950 Princeton. Some minor changes have been made.

[About one third of the text is missing. In the lacuna, words like 'stylus' and 'the king is mad' can be discerned; the sequel suggests that a Persian official made an insulting remark on Nabonidus'  incapacity to write with a stylus, that war broke out, that Nabonidus had some kind of hallucinatory vision, boasted a victory over Cyrus that he actually had not won, and was ultimately defeated. The texts continues with a comparison of the pious Cyrus and the blasphemous liar Nabonidus.]

See also
Nabonidus Chronicle
List of artifacts significant to the Bible

References

Further reading
Paul-Alain Beaulieu, The Reign of Nabonidus, King of Babylon 556-539 B.C. (1989)
Bromiley, Geoffrey W. (1995). International Standard Bible Encyclopedia: A-D Grand Rapids, Michigan. Wm. B. Eerdmans Publishing. Google preview available, accessed April 4, 2011. Archeology section is exceptionally thorough.
Goodspeed, George Stephen (1902). A History of the Babylonians and Assyrians. New York. Charles Scribner's Sons.

External links
Nabonidus Cylinder from Sippar at the British Museum.
Nabonidus Cylinder from Sippar, translation.
Nabonidus Cylinder from Ur, translation.

6th-century BC inscriptions
1854 archaeological discoveries
1881 archaeological discoveries
Neo-Babylonian Empire
Nabonidus
Ancient Near and Middle East clay objects
Middle Eastern objects in the British Museum
Nabonidus
Sippar
Ur